James Allan Stewart Evans is a Canadian historian and professor emeritus of classical Near Eastern and religious studies.

Biography
From 1955 to 1960 he was assistant professor of Classics at the University of Western Ontario and Waterloo College, London.
From 1960 to 1961 he was Visiting special lecturer in Classics at the University of Toronto.
From 1961 to 1962 he was assistant professor of classics at the University of Texas at Austin.
From 1962 to 1971 he was professor of history at the McMaster University, Hamilton, Ontario, Canada.
From 1972 to 1973 he was professor of classics at the University of British Columbia in Vancouver and became professor emeritus.

References

1931 births
Living people
20th-century Canadian historians
Canadian Byzantinists
People from Cambridge, Ontario
Scholars of Byzantine history